Photinastoma taeniatum is a species of sea snail, a marine gastropod mollusk in the family Calliostomatidae.

Description
The size of the shell varies between 10 mm and 28.5 mm.

Distribution
This marine species occurs off the Falkland Islands and in the Strait of Magellan at depths from 1 m to 115 m.

References

 Mabille, J. 1885. Descriptions de deux mollusques marins du Cap Horn. Bulletins de la Société Malacologique de France 2: 207–208.
 Rochebrune, A.-T. and J. Mabille. 1885. Diagnoses de mollusques nouveaux, recueillis par les membres de la mission du Cap Horn et M. Lebrun, Préparateur au Muséum, chargé d'une mission à Santa-Cruz de Patagonie. Bulletin de la Société Philomathique de Paris (7)9: 100–111. 
 Strebel, H. 1905. Beiträge zur Kenntnis der Molluskenfauna der Magalhaen-Provinz. II. Die Trochiden. Zoologische Jahrbücher, Supplement 8: 121–166, pl. 5.
 Cooper, J. E. and H. B. Preston. 1910. Diagnoses of new species of marine and freshwater shells from the Falkland Islands, including descriptions of two new genera of marine Pelecypoda. Annals and Magazine of Natural History (8)5: 110–114, pl. 4
 Coan, E. V.; Petit, R. E. (2011). The publications and malacological taxa of William Wood (1774-1857). Malacologia. 54(1-2): 1-76

External links
 Powell, A. W. B. (1951). Antarctic and Subantarctic Mollusca: Pelecypoda and Gastropoda. Discovery Reports. 26: 47-196, pl. 5-10
 To Antarctic Invertebrates
 To Encyclopedia of Life
 To USNM Invertebrate Zoology Mollusca Collection
 To USNM Invertebrate Zoology Mollusca Collection
 To World Register of Marine Species
 

taeniatum
Gastropods described in 1825